is a former Japanese football player.

Playing career
Yoshitaka Ohashi joined to J2 League club; Vegalta Sendai in 2006. In July 2007, he moved to NEC Tokin. In 2009, he moved to AC Nagano Parceiro and played to 2015.

References

External links

1983 births
Living people
Sendai University alumni
Association football people from Saitama Prefecture
Japanese footballers
J2 League players
J3 League players
Japan Football League players
Vegalta Sendai players
AC Nagano Parceiro players
Association football midfielders